Love and Sorrow is an album by David Murray which was recorded in 1993 and released on the Japanese DIW label. It features performances by Murray's Quartet which included John Hicks and Fred Hopkins.

Reception
Allmusic awarded the album 3 stars".

Track listing
 "You'd Be So Nice to Come Home To" (Cole Porter) - 9:14   
 "Old Folks" (Dedette Lee Hill, Willard Robison) - 10:47   
 "Forever I Love You" (Tex Allen) - 5:25   
 "Sorrow Song (For W.E.B. Dubois)" (David Murray) - 12:28   
 "A Flower Is a Lovesome Thing" (Billy Strayhorn) - 6:29   
 "You Don't Know What Love Is" (Gene de Paul, Don Raye) - 11:18

Personnel
David Murray - tenor saxophone, bass clarinet
John Hicks - piano
Fred Hopkins - bass
Idris Muhammad - drums

References 

1996 albums
David Murray (saxophonist) albums
DIW Records albums